The province of Olbia-Tempio was a province in the autonomous region of Sardinia, Italy. It had two provincial capitals, Olbia (58,723 inhabitants) and Tempio Pausania (14,342 inhabitants). The province contained 26 comuni (plural; singular: comune), see list of communes of the former Province of Olbia-Tempio.

The largest comuni in the province were Olbia (population of 45,366 as of 2001), Tempio Pausania (13,992 as of 2001), Arzachena (12,080 as of 2001) and La Maddalena (11,369 as of 2001). The former province of Olbia-Tempio was formed by a 2001 regional law that became effective in 2005. It contained a section of historic Gallura and was bordered by the provinces of Nuoro and Sassari.

On 6 May 2012 the regional referendums of Sardinia took place regarding the abolition of certain provinces and a variety of other matters. The suggestion of reforming or abolishing certain provinces in Sardinia was approved by the Regional Council of Sardinia on 24 May 2012. Due to this, the former province of Olbia-Tempio was ordered to form a new administrative body or be abolished on 1 March 2013, but this expiry date for constitutional changes was extended to 1 July 2013. Olbia-Tempio was suppressed as a province by the 2016 Regional Decree.

Government

List of presidents of the province of Olbia-Tempio

Provincial elections

References

 
Olbia